Saleh Mohammed Saleh Abdulaziz Al Ajeery (23 June 1920 – 10 February 2022) was a Kuwaiti astronomer.

He wrote many books and articles, and gave several seminars and lectures. Ajeery turned 100 in June 2020, and died on 10 February 2022, at the age of 101.

References

1920 births
2022 deaths
Kuwaiti astronomers
Kuwaiti centenarians
Men centenarians
20th-century astronomers